The 2021-22 North Dakota Fighting Hawks men's ice hockey season was the 80th season of play for the program. They represented the University of North Dakota in the 2021–22 NCAA Division I men's ice hockey season and for the 9th season in the National Collegiate Hockey Conference (NCHC). The Fighting Hawks were coached by Brad Berry, in his seventh season, and played their home games at Ralph Engelstad Arena.

Season
North Dakota's lineup saw a great deal of change with 14 of the team's 26 players in their first year with the program. While several were transfers from other schools, head coach Brad Berry had his work cut out for him in getting the team to work together. Despite the turnover, UND was still seen as having a good chance at the title and was ranked in the top-10 in the preseason polls. However, the Hawks struggled with consistency early in the season and only possessed a middling record after the first month of the campaign. Once the team got into its conference schedule, they began playing much better and rose to the top of the NCHC.

When they returned after the winter break, North Dakota was in the top-5 in both polls but the offense sputtered. UND lost four games in a row, all to ranked teams, and began sinking in both the rankings and the standings. They recovered at the end of January and then had a tremendous month by winning seven out of eight games in February. The extended winning streak put them back atop the conference standings and had the Hawks set up for a 1st-place finish. Unfortunately, losing to Omaha in the final game of the regular season put UND into a tie with Denver and, because the Pioneers possessed the tie-breaker, meant that North Dakota received the #2 seed for the NCHC tournament.

The entire second half of the Hawks season was dominated by the status of Jake Sanderson, the team's top prospect. He wasn't able to play a single game after January 29 due to joining Team USA at the 2022 Winter Olympics. During the competition, He came down with COVID-19, forcing him to miss the first game, and was then injured during the preliminary round. He remained out of the Fighting Hawks lineup for the rest of the regular season before returning for the team's quarterfinal match against Colorado College.

Sanderson opened the scoring on his return, however, in spite of the boost his reappearance provided, the Hawks did not play well against the Tigers. North Dakota had almost three times as many wins as CC during the season but they got a huge fight from their opponents. UND only managed to score twice in each of the two games and it was only through the heroics of Zach Driscoll in goal that they managed to squeeze through into the semifinals. To make matters worse, Sanderson was injured while blocking a shot in the second match and ended up needing wrist surgery to repair the damage. While the team had demonstrated an ability to win without the big defenseman, they weren't able to replicate that effort in the semifinal and fell to Western Michigan.

NCAA tournament
Though the loss was disappointing, North Dakota was already guaranteed a bid for the NCAA tournament and received a #2 seed, one of five NCHC teams in the field. They opened against Notre Dame, a team that played an almost identical style of defensive hockey. The match lived up to predictions as a slow, methodical game with few scoring attempts and solid goaltending. Brent Johnson scored near the end of the first period to give UND the lead but their advantage lasted less than 3 minutes before ND evened the match. Near the end of regulation, when it appeared that the game was heading into overtime, Notre Dame got the puck deep into the Hawks' end before passing it out to an open man in the slot and scored with less than a second to play. While the Irish celebrated, however, the referees reviewed the play and found a discrepancy in the time. The broadcast clock and the official game clock were not in synch and the file was reviewed to determine which was correct. After a long process, it was determined that the game had ended moments before the puck entered the goal and the Hawks were saved from defeat.

UND began the extra session on the power play, however, a gaff at the blueline forced Chris Jandric to take a penalty to stop a Notre Dame breakaway. After the ensuing 4-on-4 finished, The Irish got an abbreviated man-advantage and made no mistake, potting the winner and ending North Dakota's season.

Departures

Recruiting

Roster
As of September 6, 2021.

Standings

Schedule and results

|-
!colspan=12 style=";" | Exhibition

|-
!colspan=12 style=";" | Regular season

|-
!colspan=12 style=";" | 

|- align="center" bgcolor="#e0e0e0"
|colspan=12|North Dakota Won Series 2–0

|-
!colspan=12 style=";" |

Scoring statistics

Goaltending statistics

Rankings

Note: USCHO did not release a poll in week 24.

Awards and honors

Players drafted into the NHL

2022 NHL Entry Draft

† incoming freshman

References

2021–22
North Dakota Fighting Hawks
North Dakota Fighting Hawks
North Dakota Fighting Hawks
North Dakota Fighting Hawks